Cooperite may refer to:

Cooperites, members of the Gloriavale Christian Community
Cooperite (mineral)